The Embassy of the United States in Tallinn, Estonia, is located at the chancery building on Kentmanni Street.  This building housed the U.S. legation to Estonia from April 1, 1930 until September 5, 1940.  The U.S. Mission to Estonia resumed operations in the same building on February 6, 1992.

History
The United States has maintained continuous official diplomatic relations with the Republic of Estonia since July 28, 1922. Frederick W. B. Coleman of Minnesota was appointed to be the first U.S. Envoy Extraordinary and Minister Plenipotentiary to the Baltic States on September 20, 1922. He presented his credentials in Tallinn on November 20, 1922. 
From 1919 to 1922, U.S. interests in the Republic of Estonia were represented by a U.S. Commissioner based in Riga (Latvia) and a U.S. Consul based in Tallinn. Estonian diplomats have been accredited to the U.S. Department of State since 1922 and Estonian consular representatives have operated in the United States continuously since 1920. 
After the occupation of Estonia by the Soviet Union on June 17, 1940, U.S. Under Secretary of State Sumner Welles issued a statement on July 23, 1940 which established the U.S. Government's official policy of non-recognition. As a result, the United States never recognized the forcible incorporation of Estonia and the other Baltic republics of Latvia and Lithuania into the Soviet Union.
Following the restoration of Estonia's independence on August 20, 1991, the United States announced its readiness to re-establish full relations with the Republic of Estonia on September 2, 1991. 
The Embassy of the United States of America began official operations on Wednesday, October 2, 1991, at twelve o'clock.  Robert C. Frasure of West Virginia was appointed the first U.S. Ambassador Extraordinary and Plenipotentiary to Estonia on March 23, 1992. He presented his credentials on April 9, 1992. Ties between the two nations have grown closer since Estonia's accession to NATO and the European Union in 2004.

U.S. representation in Estonia
The position of United States Ambassador to Estonia has been vacant since Ambassador James D. Melville, Jr. resigned in protest over President Trump’s statements in regards to NATO and the European Union on July 29, 2019. Since that time, the United States has been represented in Estonia by Chargé d’Affaires Brian Roraff. Present at the post are officials from the Department of State, the Department of Defense, the Federal Bureau of Investigation, and the U.S. Secret Service. Regional representation includes the Departments of Homeland Security, Commerce and Agriculture as well as the Drug Enforcement Administration.

Building
Following the United States’ announcement of its readiness to re-establish full relations with the Republic of Estonia on September 2, 1991, The Embassy of the United States of America began official operations on Wednesday, October 2, 1991, in temporary chancery offices located at the Palace Hotel.  The United States Mission to Estonia resumed operations in the current U.S. Embassy chancery building located on Kentmanni Street on February 6, 1992 – the same building which housed the U.S. Legation to Estonia from April 1, 1930, until it was forced to close on September 5, 1940.

As of April 2021, preparations are underway for the development of a new embassy compound on the same site, in partnership with the city of Tallinn and the government of Estonia.

References

External links

 Official website: Policy & History
 Official website: Ambassador 
  Official website: Additional Information

Tallinn
United States
Estonia–United States relations